Summertime is the fifth  album to be released by Philadelphia International Records houseband MFSB.

Track listing
All tracks composed by Kenneth Gamble and Leon Huff; except where indicated
"Picnic in the Park"   	 4:10   	
"Summertime" (George Gershwin)	4:53 	
"Plenty Good Lovin'" 	4:33 	
"Sunnin' and Funnin'" 	(John Whitehead, Gene McFadden, Victor Carstarphen) 4:14 	
"Summertime and I'm Feelin' Mellow" (John Whitehead, Gene McFadden, Victor Carstarphen)	4:00 	
"I'm on Your Side" 	3:30 	
"Hot Summer Nights" 	4:25 	
"We Got the Time" (John Whitehead, Gene McFadden, Victor Carstarphen)	4:41

Personnel
MFSB
Bobby Eli, Norman Harris, Reggie Lucas, Roland Chambers, T.J. Tindall - guitar
Anthony Jackson, Ron Baker - bass
Leon Huff, Lenny Pakula, Eddie Green, Harold "Ivory" Williams - keyboards
Earl Young, Karl Chambers, Norman Farrington - drums
Larry Washington - percussion
Vincent Montana, Jr. - vibraphone
 Zach Zachery, Tony Williams - saxophone
 Don Renaldo and his Strings and Horns
Barbara Ingram, Carla Benson, Evette Benton, Gene McFadden, John Whitehead, Victor Carstarphen - backing vocals

Charts

Singles

References

External links
 MFSB-Summertime at Discogs

1976 albums
MFSB albums
Albums produced by Kenneth Gamble
Albums produced by Leon Huff
Albums arranged by Bobby Martin
Albums recorded at Sigma Sound Studios
Philadelphia International Records albums